The MM-1 is a 40x46mm semi-automatic grenade launcher manufactured in the United States by the Hawk Engineering Company. Relatively heavy and bulky, the MM-1 can provide considerable firepower, with practical rate of fire as high as 30 rounds per minute. It can be useful in ambushes and other fast-paced close combat situations.

While MM-1 looks much like a Milkor MGL grenade launcher with a larger cylinder, it was adapted from the Manville machine projector, a revolver-type 18-shot tear gas gun, developed in USA for police use before the Second World War.  

Michael Rogak, maker of the Rogak P-18 pistol, upsized the Manville design to 40mm and made certain design changes.  One innovation was Rogak's development of a button rifling procedure for the aluminum barrel.  This increased the speed of production while reducing costs. Subsequently, Rogak and a few others formed Hawk Engineering and began production of the MM-1.

The MM-1 is a revolver-type weapon, with the heavy cylinder being rotated for each shot by the clockwork-type spring. The spring is wound manually during the reloading. To reload the cylinder, the rear part of the gun is released and rotated sideways to expose the rear of the cylinder, which is connected to the front part of the frame and barrel.

In popular culture 

The MM-1 has appeared in several films and TV shows, most notably being wielded by Arnold Schwarzenegger as The Terminator in Terminator 2: Judgment Day and by Poncho in Predator (1987).

The MM-1 Grenade Launcher appears in the 2012 video game Call of Duty: Black Ops 2, where it can be used in the campaign gamemode.

It also appears in the 2020 video game Call of Duty: Black Ops Cold War as a scorestreak in the Multiplayer and Zombies mode.

It features in Parasite Eve 2 as a bonus weapon that can be bought in the store, upon completing the game enough times.

See also 
 RGA-86
 Manville machine projector

References

External links
 Modern Firearms page

40×46mm grenade launchers
Grenade launchers of the United States
Military equipment introduced in the 1980s